Polly Perkins (b. 1943) is a British actress, singer and writer.

Polly Perkins may also refer to:

Bill Perkins (Australian rules footballer), nicknamed "Polly"
The main character of the comic strip Polly and Her Pals
A character in the film Sky Captain and the World of Tomorrow, played by Gwyneth Paltrow
The mobile steam oven invented by Loftus Perkins

See also
"Pretty Polly Perkins of Paddington Green", an English song